These are the official results of the Men's 400 metres event at the 1991 IAAF World Championships in Tokyo, Japan. There were a total of 46 participating athletes, with six qualifying heats and the final held on Thursday August 29, 1991.

Medalists

Schedule
All times are Japan Standard Time (UTC+9)

Final

Semifinals
Held on Tuesday 1991-08-27

Quarterfinals
Held on Monday 1991-08-26

Qualifying heats
Held on Sunday 1991-08-25

See also
 1990 Men's European Championships 400 metres (Split)
 1992 Men's Olympic 400 metres (Barcelona)
 1993 Men's World Championships 400 metres (Stuttgart)

References
 Results

 
400 metres at the World Athletics Championships